15α-Hydroxydehydroepiandrosterone sulfate, abbreviated as 15α-hydroxy-DHEA sulfate or 15α-OH-DHEA-S, also known as 15α-hydroxy-17-oxoandrost-5-en-3β-yl sulfate, is an endogenous, naturally occurring steroid and a metabolic intermediate in the production of estetrol from dehydroepiandrosterone (DHEA) during pregnancy. It is the C3β sulfate ester of 15α-hydroxy-DHEA.

See also
 Pregnenolone sulfate
 Dehydroepiandrosterone sulfate
 16α-Hydroxydehydroepiandrosterone
 16α-Hydroxyandrostenedione
 16α-Hydroxyestrone
 Estrone sulfate
 C19H28O6S

References

Secondary alcohols
Androstanes
Ketones
Steroid esters
Steroid hormones
Sulfate esters